Aslıhan Gürbüz (born 16 February 1983) is a Turkish actress. She graduated from the theatre department of Selçuk University. Gürbüz won a Golden Butterfly Award for Best Comedy Actress in 2011.

Her breakthrough came with series "Bir Bulut Olsam" alongside Engin Akyürek, Engin Altan Düzyatan, Melisa Sözen. She had leading roles in "Ufak Tefek Cinayetler" and comedy series "Yahşi Cazibe". She joined hit comedy series İşler Güçler, youth series "Bodrum Masalı", historical series Muhteşem Yüzyıl: Kösem, drama "Masumlar Apartmanı", "Kırmızı Oda".

Filmography

TV series

Movies

Theatre

Award

References

External links 

1983 births
Living people
Turkish film actresses
Golden Butterfly Award winners
People from Çanakkale